Peter Schröcksnadel (born July 30, 1941 in Innsbruck) is an Austrian entrepreneur and sports administrator. He served as President of the Austrian Ski Federation (ÖSV) from 1990 to 2021 and President of the European Ski Federation (ESF) from 2009 to 2012. He is also a former vice president of the Austrian Olympic Committee.

Life 
In Innsbruck, he completed his Matura at a Handelsakademie in 1959. He studied law. In 1964, he founded Sitour Austria in Innsbruck and produced panorama and slope marking boards as well as slope guidance systems ("signalisation touristique"). His second company, Feratel Media Technologies AG, founded in 1978, developed in the early 1990s panoramic image, live broadcast weather panorama television as a tourist marketing tool, which is broadcast by various television networks. At the same time, the company develops eTourism products for the European market.

From 1978 to 1990, Peter Schröcksnadel was an instructor for general skiing in the Austrian Ski Federation and from 1987 to 1990 was vice president, and then president. In 1992, he was awarded the title of professor by the Federal Ministry of Science.

As a result of the doping scandal during the 2006 Winter Olympics, Schröcksnadel resigned from his post as Vice President of the Austrian Olympic Committee (ÖOC) the following year.

In the run-up to the 2014 Winter Olympics in Sochi, Russia, Peter Schröcksnadel spoke in a newspaper interview about the political discussions surrounding Russia's policy. He criticized a boycott of the games demanded by politicians, and was pleased that the Chancellor and the Minister of Sport of Austria wanted to visit the games. He did not want to judge the human rights violations in Russia, and advised athletes not to speak out politically. He interpreted the release of political prisoners as a positive impact of the Winter Olympics in Sochi.

Schröcksnadel stepped down as president of the ÖSV in 2021.

Schröcksnadel Group 
In addition to his work as ÖSV President, Peter Schröcksnadel is Managing Director of four ÖSV subsidiaries, namely Austria Skiteam Handels und Beteiligungs GmbH, Austria Ski Nordic Event GmbH, Austria Ski WM and Großveranstaltungs GmbH and Austria Ski Veranstaltungs GmbH. The companies are among the most important organizers of major events and other winter tourism events in Austria.

He is also managing director of Sitour Management GmbH. Today, the company operates in Austria with 30 employees worldwide and is represented in several countries in Europe, the USA and Japan . The company is now part of the Feratel Group.

Awards 

 1999 Decoration of Tyrol
 2000 Golden Medal of Styria
 2011 Decoration of Honour for Services to the Republic of Austria.
 2013 Special Lifetime Award for Austria's Sportsman of the Year.
 Honorary citizen of Schladming
 2013 Honorary Senator of the University of Innsbruck

References 

1941 births
Living people
Austrian businesspeople
Skiing executives